Ivan Vasilyevich Zhirny (born 27 September 1983) is a former Russian professional football player.

Club career
He played 7 seasons in the Russian Football National League for FC Salyut Belgorod.

References

External links
 

1983 births
Living people
Russian footballers
Association football defenders
FC Salyut Belgorod players